Thracia phaseolina is a bivalve mollusc in the family Thraciidae.

Description
The ovate shell is oblong, transverse, equilateral and inequivalve. The beaks are small; that of the left, slightly notched. The valves are white, diaphanous and smooth, indistinctly marked with striae of increase, rounded at the anterior side, strongly truncated at the posterior side. The side is bounded outwardly by an obtuse angle, pretty prominent, extending obliquely from the beak to the lower part of the shell. The cardinal edge is thin, and without teeth. It presents upon the posterior side the beaks with a small, internal, short, triangular hollow, in which is attached a small internal ligament which is apparent externally. The valves are white and shining, internally. The anterior muscular impression is elongated, the posterior is rounded, and is united to the anterior by a pallial impression, deeply notched.

Distribution
Thracia phaseolina is found in the North Atlantic Ocean and in the North Sea It is also found in the Mediterranean Sea and in the Gulf of Mexico.

References

 Poli J. X., 1791: Testacea Utriusque Siciliae eorumque historia et anatome. vol. 1 ; Parma, Regio Typographeio pp. 1–74, i–lxii, pl. 1-18 
 Lamarck ([J.-B. M.] de), 1815–1822: Histoire naturelle des animaux sans vertèbres ; Paris [vol. 5: Paris, Deterville/Verdière] [vol. 6 published by the Author] 7 vol. [I molluschi sono compresi nei vol. 5–7. Vol. 5 (Les Conchiferes): 612 pp. [25 luglio 1818]. Vol. 6 (1) (Suite): 343 pp. [1819]. Vol. 6 (2) (Suite): 232 pp. [1822]. Vol. 7: (Suite): 711 pp. 1822 
Huber, M. (2010). Compendium of bivalves. A full-color guide to 3,300 of the world's marine bivalves. A status on Bivalvia after 250 years of research. Hackenheim: ConchBooks. 901 pp., 1 CD-ROM.

External links
 World Wide Mollusc Species Database: Thracia phaseolina

Thraciidae
Bivalves described in 1818